Courtney Herbert (born 25 October 1988) is an English footballer, who plays for AFC Rushden & Diamonds.

Career
Courtney joined Northampton Town from Long Buckby in September 2009, after a successful trial. He scored his first goal on 29 September 2009 against Rotherham United in a 3–1 win. Within four games of his arrival, Herbert was linked with Watford. Herbert scored his second goal against Bury during the 2–2 draw on the October 2009, he ran from the halfway line all the way through the Bury defence to score past goalkeeper Wayne Brown.

He joined Cambridge United  on loan on 25 March and made his debut on 2 April as a second-half substitute against Altrincham.

References

External links

Living people
Footballers from Northampton
English footballers
Long Buckby A.F.C. players
Northampton Town F.C. players
English Football League players
Black British sportspeople
Cambridge United F.C. players
AFC Rushden & Diamonds players
National League (English football) players
Southern Football League players
1988 births
Association football forwards